The Easy Card (stylized as EASY Card) system is a series of linked contactless smartcard systems used by Miami-Dade Transit and South Florida Regional Transportation Authority in the South Florida area. The Easy Card allows for electronic payment on multiple public transport systems including Miami Metrorail, rapid transit rail system; Tri-Rail, commuter rail system; and Metrobus. Other public transportation agencies in the South Florida area which may eventually join the system include Broward County Transit as well as Palm Tran.

While both the Miami-Dade Transit as well as the SFRTA fare collection systems were installed by Cubic Transportation Systems, combined they are the first multiple agency regional system in the United States that interoperates through the American Public Transportation Association's Contactless Fare Media Standard.

Media formats
While the system as a whole is referred to as the "Easy Card" system, there actually is more than one type of contactless smartcard media in use:

 "Easy Cards" are plastic smartcards designed to last at least twenty years.  Easy Cards may be used to store more than one type of fare at the same time, and can be registered with the issuing transportation agency to obtain a replacement if lost or stolen.  Easy Cards programmed to charge discounted fare rates are supplied to eligible users by both Miami-Dade Transit and SFRTA, and often have the user's photograph placed on the back surface of the card.
 "Easy Tickets" are paper-based smartcard media designed to last up to 60 days.  They can only store the original fare type first loaded onto them, cannot be used for most discounted fare rates, and cannot be registered in case of loss or theft. Miami-Dade Transit offers orange-colored Easy Tickets for $56.25 to students of participating colleges and universities.

In addition to the above, SFRTA uses their Easy Card ticket machines to print out purely paper tickets that lack any smartcard media for same-day and/or weekend usage.  If a paper ticket user wishes to transfer to Metrorail, they must obtain an Easy Card or Easy Ticket at either the Tri-Rail and Metrorail transfer station or the Miami Airport station.

While Miami-Dade Transit ticket machines provide both Easy Cards as well as Easy Tickets, SFRTA/Tri-Rail ticket machines provide only Easy Cards.  Ticket agents at attended Tri-Rail stations are able to provide Easy Tickets.

Usable systems
Easy Cards and related smartcard media can be used on the following systems:
 Metrobus (Miami-Dade Transit)
 Metrorail (Miami-Dade Transit)
 Tri-Rail (SFRTA)
City of Hialeah Transit (Hialeah)
 Conchita Transit Express (private Jitney service)

Miami-Dade County is working on an interoperability agreement with Broward County Transit and PalmTran of Palm Beach County; however these systems do not yet accept Easy Cards for payment.

An Easy Card or Ticket purchased from any participating agency or at a ticket machine at any Metrorail station may be used on any participating system, provided it is loaded with the proper fare or has a sufficient balance in it.

Easy Cards and Tickets are used by scanning ("tapping") them at card readers built into Metrobus fareboxes, Metrorail faregates, and standalone validators on platforms at Tri-Rail stations. Metrobus users only have to tap their Easy Card or Ticket once when boarding. Metrorail users must tap their card or ticket at the faregates when they enter and leave the system. Tri-Rail users must tap their card or ticket at a validator before boarding and after exiting a train.

Systems which require entry and exit taps must see the exit tap of a card in order to issue a transfer. Transfer discounts within Miami-Dade Transit as well as from Tri-Rail to Miami-Dade Transit are only available when an Easy Card or Ticket is used to pay the fare both on the system/vehicle being transferred to, as well as the one previously used.

Easy Pay and contactless payments
In addition to the Easy Card system, Miami-Dade Transit implemented a system called Easy Pay for download via App Store or Google Play which allows payment of transit fares, and soon college easy ticket, using a smartphone. Once a fare has been purchased and activated, a QR code is generated containing the fare that can be scanned at selected turnstiles or shown to bus drivers.

Additional features that are in the application include 7-day, 1-day, eventually college easy tickets, and monthly passes, along with the ability to reload and view balance of an Easy Card.

Implemented in August 2019, riders are able to use their Visa, Mastercard, or AMEX contactless credit/debit cards, Apple Pay, Google Pay, and Samsung Pay at the fare gates on the Metrorail. As of February 2020, contactless bank cards and digital wallets are also accepted on Metrobuses.

References

External links
 Miami-Dade Transit EASY Card Information
 SFRTA/Tri-Rail EASY Card Information
 City of Hialeah Transit Department
 EASY Pay Information

Contactless smart cards
Miami-Dade Transit
Transportation in Miami
Fare collection systems in the United States
2009 establishments in Florida